Wrightia arborea, the woolly dyeing rosebay, is a species of flowering plant in the family Apocynaceae. It is native to the Indian Subcontinent, Southeast Asia, and southern China. A tree reaching , local peoples use it for timber and as the source of a dye.

References

arborea
Flora of the Indian subcontinent
Flora of South-Central China
Flora of Southeast China
Flora of Indo-China
Flora of Peninsular Malaysia
Plants described in 1977